The Suffering is a 2016 American horror/thriller film directed by Robert Hamilton, co-written by Hamilton and Marco Scola, and starring Phil Amico, Nick Apostolides, and Liz Christmas. It was released in the United States on July 29, 2016.

Plot
Henry Dawles, a property appraiser, begins an assignment at an isolated rural farm owned by the enigmatic Mr Remiel. He finds himself trapped and haunted by unearthly beings.

Cast

Phil Amico as Mr. Remiel
Nick Apostolides as Henry Dawles
Liz Christmas as Selena
Elizabeth Deo as Rebecca Dawles
Kina Gee as Nurse
Chappy Gould as Creature 1
Timo Gould as Creature 2
Lee Hamilton as Mrs. Gates
Fahim Hussaini as Creature 3 
Reed Peltier as Child
Chad Eric Smith	as Ahmad
Carl Stevens as Rail Thin Man
Regen Wilson as Driver

Critical reception
In his review for the Los Angeles Times, Noel Murray wrote, "Give credit to writer-director Robert Hamilton for trying something subtler than the average B-movie, but his film could've used a few more cheap shocks".

Reviewing for Starburst, Martin Unsworth gave The Suffering a score of eight stars from ten. He considered that "The Suffering is incredibly well acted, beautifully shot (making great use of the locations), and manages to build up an eerie atmosphere from the very start."

Decay Horror Mag gave "The Suffering" a score of three and a half stars from five, and wrote, "Horror enthusiasts and cinefiles will appreciate the creative direction" ... "Hamilton and Scola designed a screenplay with key elements infused into every scene."

References

External links

2016 films
American horror thriller films
2010s English-language films
Films set on farms
2010s American films